Lithariapteryx is a genus of sun moths in the family Heliodinidae. There are at least four described species in Lithariapteryx.

Species
These four species belong to the genus Lithariapteryx:
 Lithariapteryx abroniaeella Chambers, 1876 c g b
 Lithariapteryx elegans Powell, 1991 b
 Lithariapteryx jubarella Comstock, 1940 c g b
 Lithariapteryx mirabilinella Comstock, 1940 c g b
Data sources: i = ITIS, c = Catalogue of Life, g = GBIF, b = Bugguide.net

References

Further reading

External links

 

Heliodinidae